

This is a list of the National Register of Historic Places listings in Hickman County, Tennessee.

This is intended to be a complete list of the properties and districts on the National Register of Historic Places in Hickman County, Tennessee, United States.  Latitude and longitude coordinates are provided for many National Register properties and districts; these locations may be seen together in a map.

There are 11 properties and districts listed on the National Register in the county.

Current listings

|}

Former listings
Two other properties were once listed, but have since been removed:

|}

See also

 List of National Historic Landmarks in Tennessee
 National Register of Historic Places listings in Tennessee

References

Hickman
 
Buildings and structures in Hickman County, Tennessee